Kayyngdy (or Каинда Kainda) is a city in the Chüy Region of Kyrgyzstan. It became a city in 2012. Its population was 9,561 in 2021. It is the seat of Panfilov District. It features the railroad station closest to the Kazakhstan border on the north route of the Kyrgyz Railways and is the first town one enters when traveling to Kyrgyzstan by train.

Population

References 

Populated places in Chüy Region